Vojtěch Caska (born 20 April 1954) is a Czech rower. He competed at the 1976 Summer Olympics and the 1980 Summer Olympics.

References

External links
 

1954 births
Living people
People from Brno-Country District
Czech male rowers
Olympic rowers of Czechoslovakia
Rowers at the 1976 Summer Olympics
Rowers at the 1980 Summer Olympics
Sportspeople from the South Moravian Region